Charles Henry Sloan (May 2, 1863 – June 2, 1946) was an American Republican Party politician.

Biography
Born in Monticello, Iowa on May 2, 1863, he graduated from Iowa State Agricultural College (now Iowa State University) at Ames, Iowa in 1884. He moved to Fairmont, Nebraska and became the city schools superintendent from 1884 to 1887. He studied law and was admitted to the bar in 1887. He started practice in Fairmont but then moved to Geneva, Nebraska in 1891. He became the director of the Geneva State Bank and then the prosecuting attorney of Fillmore County from 1890 to 1894.

He was elected to the Nebraska State Senate from 1894 to 1896. He was the chairman of the Republican State convention in 1903. Then he was elected to the sixty-second congress and the three succeeding congress as a Republican (March 4, 1911 – March 3, 1919). He voted on April 5, 1917, against declaring war on Germany. He didn't run in 1918, but ran again for the 71st Congress and won, serving from March 4, 1929, to March 3, 1931. He ran and lost in 1930, resuming practice of law in Geneva. He also did some banking. He died in Geneva on June 2, 1946, and is buried in the Geneva Cemetery.

References
 
 
 
 

1863 births
1946 deaths
Nebraska lawyers
Republican Party Nebraska state senators
Republican Party members of the United States House of Representatives from Nebraska
People from Monticello, Iowa
People from Fillmore County, Nebraska
People from Geneva, Nebraska